Colmars or Colmars-les-Alpes (Còumars in provençal) is a commune in the Alpes-de-Haute-Provence department in southeastern France.

The official name of the commune, according to the geographical code of the INSEE, is "Colmars", but it is always referred locally as "Colmars-les-Alpes", even though it is not recognised in legal situations. The signs on entering the village read "Colmars-les-Alpes".

Geography
The village is situated at the confluence of the rivers Verdon and Lance, at an altitude of 1250 metres. The site of the village is a site inscrit, a site of special natural, scientific or historical interest.

Hamlets
There are two other hamlets in the commune: Clignon-Haut and Clignon-Bas.

Population

The inhabitants are called Colmarsiens.

Geography

Mountains and peaks
There are numerous high points in the commune. The main ones are:

 Tête de l'Encombrette (2682m)
 Autapie (2426m)
 Roche Cline
 Valpane

History
The name of the village comes from a hill dedicated to Mars by the Romans ("Collo Marto"). The village was originally situated further up a hill, but the site was judged to be too cramped and not possible to expand any further, so it was abandoned. It was destroyed by Raymond de Turenne in 1390.

Modern era
In the French Wars of Religion, the site was the target of several attacks:

 Paulon de Mauvans, a Protestant captain, pillaged the village in 1560;
 Cartier, a captain operating on behalf of de Mauvans, took and ransomed the village in 1583;
 The French Catholic League sacked the village a few years later.

Gallery

See also
 Verdon River
 Col d'Allos
Communes of the Alpes-de-Haute-Provence department

References

External links
 Webpage about the fortifications

Communes of Alpes-de-Haute-Provence
Alpes-de-Haute-Provence communes articles needing translation from French Wikipedia